Calopteryx intermedia is a species of broad-winged damselfly in the family Calopterygidae.

Subspecies
These three subspecies belong to the species Calopteryx intermedia:
 Calopteryx intermedia cecilia Bartenef, 1912
 Calopteryx intermedia intermedia
 Calopteryx intermedia persica Bartenef, 1911

References

Further reading

 

Calopterygidae
Articles created by Qbugbot
Insects described in 1890